Dewey D. Scanlon (August 16, 1899 – September 24, 1944) was an American football coach, and was the head coach for the National Football League's  Duluth Kelleys/Eskimos from 1924 to 1926 and for the Chicago Cardinals in 1929. As an NFL head coach, he compiled a record of 17–15–4 in four seasons. He also appeared in one game as a wingback for Duluth in 1926. Scanlon was born in Duluth, Minnesota and attended Valparaiso University.

References

External links
 

1899 births
1944 deaths
Chicago Cardinals coaches
Duluth Eskimos players
Valparaiso Beacons football players
Players of American football from Duluth, Minnesota
Chicago Cardinals head coaches